The needle-clawed bushbabies are the two species in the genus Euoticus, which is in the family Galagidae. Galagidae is sometimes included as a subfamily within the Lorisidae (or Loridae).

 Genus Euoticus 
 Southern needle-clawed bushbaby, E. elegantulus
 Northern needle-clawed bushbaby, E. pallidus
 E. p. pallidus
 E. p. talboti

Unique to the needle-clawed bushbaby are the keeled nails, featuring prominent central ridges ending in needle-like points, present on all digits except the thumbs, the big toes, and the second foot phalanges which have claws.

The first specimen of E. elegantulus to arrive in Europe from Africa was brought by Gerald Durrell. The uncovering of this bush baby is documented in his 1957 book A Zoo in My Luggage.

References

External links

 Primate Info Net Euoticus Factsheets

Galagidae
Galagos
Taxa named by John Edward Gray
Taxa described in 1863